The 2020–21 Pepperdine Waves men's basketball team represented Pepperdine University during the 2020–21 NCAA Division I men's basketball season. The Waves are led by head coach Lorenzo Romar, in the third season of his second stint after coaching the Waves from 1996 to 1999. They played their home games at the Firestone Fieldhouse in Malibu, California as members of the West Coast Conference. They finished the season 15-12, 7-6 to finish in 4th place. They defeated Santa Clara in the quarterfinals of the WCC tournament before losing in the semifinals to BYU. They received an invitation to the CBI where they defeated Longwood, Bellarmine, and Coastal Carolina to become CBI Champions.

Previous season
The Waves finished the 2019–20 season 16–16, 8–8 in WCC play to finish in sixth place. They defeated Santa Clara in the second round of the WCC tournament before losing in the third round to Saint Mary's.

Roster

Schedule and results

|-
!colspan=9 style=| Non conference regular season

|-
!colspan=9 style=| WCC regular season
|-

|-
!colspan=12 style=| WCC tournament
|-

|-
!colspan=12 style=| CBI
|-

Source:

References

Pepperdine Waves men's basketball seasons
Pepperdine
Pepperdine
Pepperdine
Pepperdine
College Basketball Invitational championship seasons